Mizuho Station is a train station in Hokkaidō, Japan.

Mizuho Station may also refer to:

Mizuho Station (Antarctica), Antarctic transshipment station